Eddie Falk (born October 12, 1959) is a former American stock car racing driver from Norfolk, Virginia. Falk competed in 98 NASCAR Busch Series races from 1982 to 1987. Falk completed his NASCAR career with 24 top ten finishes and 1 pole position. Falk competed in one ARCA race in 1985 at Indianapolis Raceway Park. He also attempted one NASCAR Winston Cup race in 1981 at Martinsville Speedway, but he failed to qualify for the event. 

His son C. E. Falk also competed in NASCAR.

Motorsports career results

NASCAR
(key) (Bold – Pole position awarded by qualifying time. Italics – Pole position earned by points standings or practice time. * – Most laps led.)

Winston Cup Series

ARCA Talladega SuperCar Series
(key) (Bold – Pole position awarded by qualifying time. Italics – Pole position earned by points standings or practice time. * – Most laps led.)

References

External links
 
 

NASCAR drivers
Racing drivers from Virginia
Living people

1959 births